Quddusi Sahab Ki Bewah is a Pakistani comedy television series which premiered in 2012 on ARY Digital. The series became popular soon after its initial telecast due to storyline, authentic humour and Hina Dilpazeer's acting in multiple roles, portraying more than 20 characters. It is the follow up television series of telefilms written by Fasih Bari Khan and directed by Mazhar Moin.

Plot
It is a story of two families living in upper and lower stories of a house. The householder Aleem-ud-Din lives upstairs with his family consisting of his wife Nunhi, a divorced daughter Bhunarya, a son Maqsood and daughter-in-law Rooh Afzaa. While Qudussi's widow, Shakooran live downstairs as tenant with her three daughters Khajusta Jahan, Badraka Jahan, Shagufta Jahan and a son Abdul Wudood Ahmad. Aqeela Bhabhi is also a major character who is a neighbor and a good friend of Shakooran. Both families are later shifted to a new house which is owned by Shakooran, when Shagufta Jahan is married to Aleem-ud-Din. Aqeela is kicked out of her own house by her sons and lives with Shakooran, who makes her do all the housework.

Cast and characters

Production

Filming
The principal shooting of the serial took place in Karachi. Whereas for some episodes, shooting also took place at Murree.

Reception 

The series received critical acclaim due to its humour, storyline and Dilpazir's performance. Her performance in almost 40 characters (including the titular characters, supporting characters and some recurring characters) earned her praise from critics as well as audience.

Accolades

References

External links
 Official Website
 Maqsood Bhai " Quddusi Saahib ki bewah " Passed Away Today

Pakistani television sitcoms
Pakistani drama television series
Urdu-language television shows
Television shows set in Karachi
ARY Digital original programming
2012 Pakistani television series debuts
2014 Pakistani television series endings